Claude's Crib is an American comedy television series created by Claude Brooks and Linda M. Yearwood. The series stars Claude Brooks, Tembi Locke, Jennifer Aspen, Matt Champagne, Anthony Michael Hall, James Wong and Larry Hankin. The series aired on USA Network from January 5, 1997, to March 2, 1997.

Cast 
 Claude Brooks as Claude 
 Tembi Locke as Kaylene 
 Jennifer Aspen as Julie 
 Matt Champagne as Bailey 
 Anthony Michael Hall as "Shorty" 
 James Wong as Desmond "Des" 
 Larry Hankin as Al

Episodes

References

External links
 

1990s American sitcoms
1997 American television series debuts
1997 American television series endings
English-language television shows
Television series by CBS Studios
USA Network original programming